Miracle Nights Tour is the first headlining tour by Brandon Lake. The tour started on October 7, 2022, at Bayside Church in Granite Bay, California and will conclude on April 23, 2023, at NorthRidge Church in Plymouth, Michigan, comprising 26 dates across several cities in the United States.

Background
On April 11, 2022, Brandon Lake announced his first headlining tour, dubbed the Miracle Nights Tour, joined by Blessing Offor and Joshua Silverberg as special guests and set to visit twelve cities in the United States during the fall of 2022. The tour commenced at October 7, 2022 at Bayside Church in Granite Bay, California and concluded on November 20, 2022, at Seacoast Church in Mount Pleasant, South Carolina. The tour was intended to showcase Lake's most popular songs, including "Graves Into Gardens," "Too Good to Not Believe," and "Gratitude," as well as songs from his third studio album, Help! (2022). On October 10, 2022, Brandon Lake announced that he partnered with partnered with Reboot Recovery, a faith-based trauma healing program, to provide immediate assistance concertgoers dealing with mental health struggles.

On November 14, 2022, Lake announced the spring 2023 leg of the Miracle Nights Tour, with Benjamin William Hastings joining him as a special guest. The spring will begin on March 17, 2023, at Central Church in Henderson, Nevada, and conclude on April 23, 2023, at NorthRidge Church in Plymouth, Michigan.

Commercial performance
On November 3, 2022, it was announced that the fall leg of the Miracle Nights Tour was completely sold out. Tickets for most dates selling out months and weeks prior to the show, and the ticket pricing for an artist's first headline tour was higher than the industry average. Tour presenters Transparent Productions indicated that the spring leg of the tour will be launched in November, following the success of the fall leg.

Set list
This set list is representative of the October 8, 2022 show at Rock Church in San Diego, California.

 "Help!"
 "We Praise You"
 "Honey in the Rock"
 "Rest on Us"
 "Greater Still"
 "Same God"
 "Too Good to Not Believe"
 "House of Miracles"
 "Rattle!"
 "Talking to Jesus"
 "Fear Is Not My Future"
 "Champion"
 "Gratitude"
 "Graves Into Gardens"

Tour dates

References

External links
 
 

2022 concert tours
Concert tours of the United States